Federal Neuro-Psychiatric Hospital, Benin City is a federal government of Nigeria speciality hospital located in Benin, Edo State, Nigeria. The current chief medical director is Imafidon Agbonile.

History 
Federal Neuro-Psychiatric Hospital, Benin City was established on 7 December, 1964. The hospital was formerly known as Uselu Clinic.

CMD 
The current chief medical director is Imafidon Agbonile.

References 

Hospitals in Nigeria